Ultimate Texas Hold 'Em (also known as Ultimate Texas holdem and Ultimate Texas Hold'em) is registered trademark of Bally Gaming, Inc. and refers to a reinvented variant of the classic poker game Texas hold 'em. In this variation, the player does not compete against other players. Instead, they play only against the dealer. At any point during the course of the hand, the player is free to make one raise. In this poker-based game (community cards), the earlier the raise is made, the higher its value is.

The game begins with the player making a blind bet and an ante. They are also provided with an optional Trips side which allows them to acquire a payout whether their hand loses or wins. Ultimate Texas Hold 'em is different from other poker-based games in the sense that the ante still remains in play even after the players made a raise and even if the dealer does not open.

Objective
The format of Ultimate Texas Hold ‘Em is similar to other variants of poker available in most casinos and online poker sites. The player and the dealer will both get two cards. The player will then be allowed to look at his cards and decide if he wishes to check or raise four times the ante. Another option available to the player is raising three times. If the player decides to raise at any point during the hand, the action will end from his end.

After deciding to raise, the player will be shown three cards which are referred to as the “flop”. The other players who did not raise before the flop will be given the choice to raise twice the ante. Another option available for the player would be checking.
After the table has resolved the post-flop betting, the last two cards will be revealed. By this time, the players will be required to either match their ante or fold. After this, the dealer will reveal his two cards and grade the hand. In order for the dealer to qualify, he must possess at least a paired board. The ante pushes if the dealer fails to qualify. The same is true even in a scenario where the player possesses a hand that loses to the dealer. On the other hand, if the dealer qualifies, the one who wins the ante bet will be the player with the best hand.

Despite the dealer’s disqualification, the raises and the blind will still remain in play. Meanwhile, if the dealer beats the player, the blind bet and the raise will both lose. On the other hand, if the player beats the dealer, their raise will be matched. Ties push both the raise and the blind bet.

History
Ultimate Texas Hold ‘Em was developed by Roger Snow of Bally Gaming, Inc. (formerly Shuffle Master). It is one of the newest variations of the poker game and is currently widely popular among US casinos. It is one of the most in-demand niche table games in casinos in Las Vegas and many other states.

Initially, Ultimate Texas Hold ‘Em was only available on multi-player electronic machines. However, through the years, its popularity increased and some casinos decided to pick it up and expand it, turning it into a table game.

Rules
Like the common poker game formats, Ultimate Texas Hold ‘Em is played with a single, regular 52-card deck. Towards the end of the game, the dealer and the players left use any combination from their own two cards and the five community cards in order to come up with the best possible hand for themselves. The dealer will only be able to open if they possess at least a paired board. The play, ante, and blind bets are graded, depending on who wins, and whether the dealer will open. The table below illustrates the scoring guidelines.

Winning play and ante bets are rewarded 1 to 1. Look at the table below to learn how winning blind bets are paid out.

On the other hand, the payout for trips bets depends on the value of the player’s hand – regardless of the value of the hand possessed by the dealer.

References

External links 
Texas Holdem rules

Texas hold 'em